A palace is a grand residence, usually for royalty or other high-ranking dignitaries.

Palace may also refer to:

Places
 Palace, Missouri, a community in the United States
 Palace Site an archeological site in Des Moines, Iowa, U.S.

Buildings

 Buckingham Palace (sometimes referred to as "The Palace" to represent the British monarch
 Palace, Blackpool, a former British entertainment complex 
 Palace (hotel), a grade classification of French hotels
 Palace II (building), a building that collapsed in Rio de Janeiro, Brazil
 The Palace (entertainment complex), a defunct entertainment complex in Victoria, Australia
 The Palace (Miami), a residential high-rise in Miami, Florida, U.S.
 The Palace of Auburn Hills, a defunct arena in suburban Detroit, Michigan, U.S.
 Avalon Hollywood, formerly known as The Palace, a nightclub in Hollywood, California, U.S.
 Grandmaster's Palace (Valletta), Malta, officially known as "The Palace"

Arts, entertainment and media

Film and television
 The Palace (2011 film), a Cypriot–Australian short film
 The Palace (2013 film), a Chinese film
 The Palace (2023 film), an upcoming black comedy film written and directed by Roman Polanski
 Palace (TV series), a Chinese TV series
Palace II
 Palace, an alternate title for the South Korean TV series Princess Hours
 The Palace, a British television series about a fictional monarchy
 Palace Cinemas, a cinema chain in central Europe.
 Palace Cinemas, a cinema chain in Australia

Literature
The Palace, a 1970 novel by Wiesław Myśliwski

Music
 Palace (band), a British alternative rock band
 Palace (album), a 2011 album by Chapel Club
 Palaces (album), a 2022 album by Flume
 "Palace", a 2014 song by The Antlers from Familiars
 "Palace", a 2016 song by Hayley Kiyoko from Citrine
 "Palace", a 2017 song by Sam Smith from The Thrill of It All
 "Palace", a 2018 song by D-Crunch from 0806
 Will Oldham, an American musician, who recorded under several names, including "Palace", "Palace Music", and "Palace Brothers"

Other uses
 Palace Entertainment, an American amusement and entertainment company
 The Palace (computer program), a chat room program launched in 1995
 Crystal Palace F.C., an English football club commonly referred to as "Palace"
 Palace (clothing shop), a popular British retailer of limited edition clothing items

See also

Palazzo (disambiguation)
Palais (disambiguation)
Palas (disambiguation)
 Ducal Palace
 Grand Palace (disambiguation)
 Royal Palace (disambiguation)
Castle (disambiguation)